Marcio Reolon is a Brazilian film director, screenwriter, producer and actor.

Career 
His first feature film Seashore premiered worldwide at the Forum section of the Berlin International Film Festival in 2015. In Brazil the film premiered at the Rio International Film Festival, where it was the winner of the Best Film award at the Novos Rumos section and the Félix Jury Special Award.

In 2018, his second feature film Hard Paint premiered at the Panorama section of the 2018 Berlin Film Festival, winning the Teddy Award for Best Film, as well as the International Confederation of Art Cinemas award for Best Film of the Panorama section. In Brazil, Hard Paint was the main winner at the Rio International Film Festival, with the awards for Best Film, Best Screenplay, Best Actor and Best Supporting Actor. Hard Paint was screened at over 100 film festivals around the world, winning over 30 awards, and was on several lists of best films of 2018 and best film of the decade.

He often co-writes and directs his films with Filipe Matzembacher.

References 

Brazilian film directors
Year of birth missing (living people)
Living people